Solbjørg Højfeldt (born 10 June 1947, in Copenhagen) is a Danish actress. She has performed in more than fifty films since 1978. She is married to Danish actor Henning Jensen.

Selected filmography

Awards
 Bodil Award for Best Actress in a Leading Role (1982)

References

External links 

Solbjørg Højfeldt at Den Danske Film Database (in Danish)

1947 births
Living people
Danish film actresses
Actresses from Copenhagen
Best Actress Bodil Award winners